Kagamba is a town in the Ntungamo District of the Western Region of Uganda.

Location
The coordinates of the town are 0°49'05.0"S, 30°09'36.0"E (Latitude:-0.8181; Longitude:30.1600).

Points of interest
The following points of interest lie within Kagamba or near its borders:

 Kagamba Roman Catholic Parish Church, affiliated with the Roman Catholic Archdiocese of Mbarara
 southern end of the  Ishaka–Kagamba Road.
 Ntungamo–Rukungiri Road, passing through the town in a general southeast to northwest direction.

See also
 Transport in Uganda
 List of roads in Uganda
 List of cities and towns in Uganda
 Economy of Uganda

References

External links

Populated places in Western Region, Uganda
Cities in the Great Rift Valley
Ntungamo District